Margaret Walthour Lippitt (November 5, 1872 – July 23, 1964) was an oil painter and art teacher. She was born in Clayton, Alabama, and raised in Savannah, Georgia. As a young woman, she taught art at a private girls' school in Tuscaloosa, where she lived with her grandfather, Major General Henry D. Clayton, then President of the University of Alabama at Tuscaloosa.

Lippitt spent several years in Washington, DC, living with her aunt and uncle, Senator James L. Pugh, while she studied painting under Howard Helmick. While in another of Helmick's classes in Blowing Rock, North Carolina, Lippitt met her future husband, Devereux H. Lippitt, whom she married in 1894.

In 1898, Lippitt attended the Académie Julian. John Singer Sargent commented on her Titian hair when she was sketching at the Louvre. In 1904 she moved to Bremen for her husband's business. While there, she frequently visited the artists' colony at Worpswede and befriended Paula Modersohn-Becker and Rilke.

References

1872 births
1964 deaths
People from Clayton, Alabama
Painters from Alabama
19th-century American painters
20th-century American painters
19th-century American women artists
20th-century American women artists
American women painters
American art educators
American women educators